Sarangesa sati, commonly known as the tiny flat, is a species of butterfly in the family Hesperiidae. It is endemic to the Kutch district of India.   The species is alternatively listed as a race or subspecies of Sarangesa purendra.

References

Butterflies described in 1891
Celaenorrhinini
Butterflies of Asia